The Mon alphabet is a Brahmic abugida used for writing the Mon language. It is an example of the Mon-Burmese script, which derives from the Pallava Grantha script of southern India.

History 
The earliest Mon inscriptions, all undated, have been paleographically dated to the 6th century CE; they are found in Nakhon Pathom and Saraburi (in Thailand). Terracotta votive tablets found in Lower Burma have been paleographically dated to either the 6th century CE or the 11th century CE. The inscriptions were written in Grantha script. Grantha script is usually called Pallava or Kadamba. It is one of the scripts of the southern part of India in the sixth century and was the most influential script used in early Burma. The script was used in writing Pāli inscriptions, generally of the Buddhist canon, that had been found in both the Mon ancient city Thaton and Pyu ancient city Śrī Kşetra. The modern Mon and Burman scripts evolved from this Grantha script. The way it developed was very similar to the early Kawi script in Old Java.  The Pallava-Grantha script in Java developed into the so-called early Kawi script in the 8th century CE But Aung-Thwin argues that there is no extant evidence or linguistic proof linking the Old Dvaravati Mon script and the Burma Mon script.

A number of Mon stone inscriptions have been found in Thaton and its environs, Lower Burma. They are all undated. H. L. Shorto and other scholars assigned them to the eleventh century, but they could possibly be earlier. According to linguistic analyses of the inscriptions all of them belong to Old Mon: especially the inscription on the robe of a statue at Kawgun Cave and two important inscriptions Trāp and Panḍit. Its writing style is very similar to the Dinaya inscription of 760 CE, written in Sanskrit, with the Kawi script of Old Java. Those inscriptions grammatically and linguistically belong to Old Mon. Old Mon is dated to around the 5th to the 12th century CE. During this period the Mon writing characters can similarly be divided into two or three types, but the language was not much different. For example, the word for seven from Phra Pathom inscription (6th century) is duṁpoh, from Pagan (12th century) also (duṁpoh ဒုံပေါဟ်). In the period from the late 12th to the early 13th century, Old Mon gradually transformed through language contact into Middle Mon. Middle Mon was characterized by the Great Vowel Shift, in which the long vowels of Old Mon changed to short vowels. For example, the word 'duṁpoh ဒုံပေါဟ်' (for seven) became 'thapah ထပဟ်'. The long vowel 'uṁ' was shifted.

Alphabet 
The calligraphy of modern Mon script follows that of modern Burmese. Burmese calligraphy originally followed a square format but the cursive format took hold in the 17th century when popular writing led to the wider use of palm leaves and folded paper known as parabaiks. The script has undergone considerable modification to suit the evolving phonology of the Burmese language, but additional letters and diacritics have been added to adapt it to other languages; the Shan and Karen alphabets, for example, require additional tone markers.

The modern Mon alphabet has several letters and diacritics that do not exist in Burmese, such as the stacking diacritic for medial 'l', which is placed underneath the letter. There is a great deal of discrepancy between the written and spoken forms of Mon, with a single pronunciation capable of having several spellings. The Mon script also makes prominent use of consonant stacking, to represent consonant clusters found in the language.

Vowels

Main vowels and diphthongs

Other vowels and diphthongs

Consonants 
The Mon alphabet contains 35 consonants (including a zero consonant), as follows, with consonants belonging to the breathy register indicated in gray:

In the Mon script, consonants belong to one of two registers: clear and breathy, each of which has different inherent vowels and pronunciations for the same set of diacritics. For instance, which belongs to the clear register, is pronounced , while  is pronounced , to accommodate the vowel complexity of the Mon phonology. The addition of diacritics makes this obvious. Whereas in Burmese spellings with the same diacritics are rhyming, in Mon this depends on the consonant's inherent register. A few examples are listed below:
  +  → , pronounced 
  +  → , pronounced 
  +  → , pronounced 
  +  → , pronounced 

Consonantal finals are indicated with a virama, as in Burmese: however, instead of being pronounced as glottal stops as in Burmese, final plosives usually keep their respective pronunciations. Furthermore, consonant stacking is possible in Mon spellings, particularly for Pali and Sanskrit-derived vocabulary.

Punctuation

Unicode
The Mon script has been encoded as a part of the Myanmar block with the release version of Unicode 3.0.

Four types of Mon writing

Gallery

Notes

References

Bibliography

 

 

Brahmic scripts